The Federal Correctional Institution Greenville (FCI Greenville) is a medium-security United States federal prison for male offenders in Illinois, with an adjacent satellite prison camp for minimum-security female offenders.  It is operated by the Federal Bureau of Prisons, a division of the United States Department of Justice.

FCI Greenville is located approximately 43 miles east of St. Louis, Missouri, and 63 miles from Springfield, Illinois.

History
The prison camp was turned into a women's facility in 2000 in order to make more space for women in the north central U.S.

Notable incidents
In 2001, David Mack, a central figure in the LAPD Rampart Scandal, was attacked by a group of fellow inmates while jogging in the prison recreation yard at FCI Greenville. The Bureau of Prisons and the FBI refused to confirm that the attack occurred, but Mack's attorney reported that the inmates were gang members who attacked Mack after they saw a television program and read press accounts that detailed Mack's role in stealing from gang members and his connection with fellow officer Rafael Perez, another central figure in the scandal. Mack was taken to a local hospital and was treated for multiple stab wounds and a punctured lung. He was released two days later and returned to the prison.

Notable inmates (current and former)

See also

List of U.S. federal prisons
Federal Bureau of Prisons
Incarceration in the United States

References

External links
FCI Greenville—official website

Buildings and structures in Bond County, Illinois
Greenville, Illinois
Prisons in Illinois
Greenville